Lungwort is a common name for several plants and may refer to:

Flowering plants
Pulmonaria, a genus of flowering plants, specifically
Pulmonaria officinalis
Hieracium murorum, French or golden lungwort
Helleborus niger, black lungwort
Mertensia
Verbascum thapsus (bullock's lungwort, cow's lungwort, clown's lungwort)

Lichens
Lobaria pulmonaria (lungwort lichen)